Benjamin Wood (1787 – 13 August 1845) was a British Whig politician.

Life

He was born in Tiverton, Devon the son of William Wood.

Wood became a Whig MP for Southwark at a by-election in 1840—caused by the resignation of Daniel Whittle Harvey—and held the seat until his death at Eltham Lodge in Kent in 1845.

He is buried in Cressing in Essex.

Family

In October 1815 in Kenwyn in Cornwall, he married Anna Marie Michell (1791-1889) daughter of Admiral Sampson Michell and sister of Admiral Frederick Thomas Michell and Charles Collier Michell.

References

External links
 

UK MPs 1837–1841
UK MPs 1841–1847
Whig (British political party) MPs for English constituencies
1787 births
1845 deaths